FK Buxoro is an Uzbek professional football club based in Bukhara. Founded in 1989, the club competes in the Uzbekistan Super League.

History

The club was founded in 1960 under name Bukhoro. In 1989 club was renamed to Nurafshon. During the 1990 season the club played in the Soviet Second League, zone "East", finishing in 4th position. Buxoro played its first Oliy League season in 1992. The best club performance in Oliy League is runners-up of 1994 season after Neftchi Farg'ona.
FK Bukhoro played three times in semi-final of Uzbek Cup. In 2005 Cup semi-final club lost to Neftchi Farg'ona in two legs by 1–3 and in 2012 lost to Nasaf with a 3–5 score. After the 2013 season had finished, on 10 November 2013 Edgar Gess became new head coach of Bukhoro, replacing Tachmurad Agamuradov in this position.

Name changes 
 1960–67: FC Bukhoro
 1967–80: Fakel Bukhoro
 1980–88: FC Bukhoro
 1989–97: Nurafshon Buxoro
 1997–2021: FK Buxoro
 2021 (since September): Nurafshon Buxoro
 2022–: FK Buxoro

Domestic history

Current squad

Honours
Uzbek League
Runners-up: 1994

Uzbekistan First League
Champions (1): 2010

Managerial history

 Oleg Bugaev (1990)
 Stanislav Kaminskiy (1991–92)
 Boris Lavrov (1993)
 Alexander Ivankov (1994)
 Mustafa Belyalov (1995)
 Islom Akhmedov (1996)
 Igor Plyugin (1996)
 Stanislav Kaminskiy (1997–98)
 Khakim Fuzailov (1998–99)
 Usmon Toshev (2000–08)
 Rauf Inileev (2009–10)
 Gennadiy Kochnev (2010–11)
 Jamshid Saidov (2012)
 Tachmurad Agamuradov (2012–13)
 Edgar Gess (2014)
 Said Seýidow (interim) (2014)
 Alexander Mochinov (2014 – May 17, 2015)
 Shukhrat Fayziev (interim) (May 21, 2015 – July 5, 2015)
 Jamshid Saidov (July 5, 2015 – January 26, 2017)
 Ulugbek Bakayev (January 26, 2017– )

References

External links
 Official website
 Weltfussballarchiv 
 PFC Bukhoro- UzPFL

Buxoro
Association football clubs established in 1989
1989 establishments in Uzbekistan
Bukhara